Thomas Jay Ryan (born August 1, 1962) is an American stage and film actor. He may be best known for his starring role in the 1997 film Henry Fool.

Early life and education 
Born in Pittsburgh, Pennsylvania, Ryan attended Carnegie Mellon University and has worked in such theaters as the Guthrie Theater in Minneapolis and the Yale Repertory Theatre in New Haven. In addition, he has worked with avant garde playwright Richard Foreman and has played roles ranging from Dracula to Degas.

Career 
Ryan had supporting roles in a variety of films, including Teknolust, Eternal Sunshine of the Spotless Mind, The Book of Life, Dream Boy, and the sequels to Henry Fool, Fay Grim (2007) and Ned Rifle (2014).

He played pioneering gay activist Harry Hay in the initial production of the play The Temperamentals in 2009 in New York. In 2016, Ryan played Thomas Putnam in Ivo van Hove's production of Arthur Miller's play The Crucible at the Walter Kerr Theatre on Broadway. In 2019 he appeared in the off-Broadway play Eureka Day.

Filmography

Film

Television

References

External links

"Thomas Jay Ryan Embraces a Comfortably Unpredictable Acting Career" by Alexis Soloski, The New York Times, 11 October 2015

1962 births
Living people
American male film actors
American male stage actors
Male actors from Pittsburgh